Hillcrest is a historic home and national historic district located at Cazenovia in Madison County, New York. The district contains four contributing buildings. The main house was built in 1903 and is an irregularly massed, three story frame residence built in a combination of the Colonial Revival and Queen Anne styles.  It features a conical, three story turret and rounded, one story enclosed porch.  Also on the property is a carriage house, guest house, and formal gateway.

It was added to the National Register of Historic Places in 1991.

References

Houses on the National Register of Historic Places in New York (state)
Historic districts on the National Register of Historic Places in New York (state)
Queen Anne architecture in New York (state)
Colonial Revival architecture in New York (state)
Houses completed in 1903
Houses in Madison County, New York
National Register of Historic Places in Cazenovia, New York
1903 establishments in New York (state)